Miguel Mas Gayà (born 13 July 1943) is a retired Spanish cyclist who won the UCI Motor-paced World Championships in 1965. He won the national titles in motor-paced racing in 1962–1964 and in individual pursuit in 1964. He retired in 1967, aged 24, due to illness.

References

1943 births
Living people
Spanish male cyclists
Sportspeople from Manacor
Cyclists from the Balearic Islands